Alexis Bidagan dit St-Martin (April 8, 1802 – June 24, 1880) was a Canadian voyageur who is known for his part in experiments on digestion in humans, conducted on him by the American Army physician William Beaumont between 1822 and 1833. St-Martin was shot in a near-fatal accident in 1822. His wound did not heal fully, leaving an opening into his stomach. Studies of St-Martin's stomach led to greater understanding of the stomach, gastric juices and the processes of digestion.

Work with Beaumont 

On June 6, 1822, St-Martin was accidentally shot with a musket at close range at the fur trading post on Mackinac Island. The charge of the musket shot left a hole through his side that healed to form a fistula aperture into his stomach.

William Beaumont, a US Army surgeon stationed at a nearby army post, treated the wound. Although St-Martin was a healthy young man in his 20s, he was not expected to recover due to the severity of his wound. Beaumont explains in a later paper that the shot blew off fragments of St-Martin's muscles and broke a few of his ribs. After bleeding him and giving him a cathartic, Beaumont marked St-Martin's progress. For the next 17 days, all food he ate re-emerged from his new gastric fistula. Finally after 17 days, the food began to stay in St-Martin's stomach and his bowels began to return to their natural functions.

When the wound healed itself, the edge of the hole in the stomach had attached itself to the edge of the hole in the skin, creating a permanent gastric fistula. There was very little scientific understanding of digestion at the time and Beaumont recognized the opportunity he had in St-Martin – he could literally watch the processes of digestion by dangling food on a string into St-Martin's stomach, then later pulling it out to observe to what extent it had been digested. Beaumont continued to experiment on St-Martin off and on until 1833, performing an estimated 200 experiments in 10 years.

St-Martin allowed the experiments to be conducted, not as an act to repay Beaumont for keeping him alive, but rather because Beaumont had the illiterate St-Martin sign a contract to work as a servant. Beaumont recalls the chores St-Martin did: "During this time, in the intervals of experimenting, he performed all the duties of a common servant, chopping wood, carrying burthens, etc. with little or no suffering or inconvenience from his wound." Although these chores were not bothersome, some of the experiments were painful to St-Martin, for example when Beaumont had placed sacks of food in the stomach, Beaumont noted: "the boy complained of some pain and uneasiness at the breast." Other symptoms St-Martin felt during experiments were a sense of weight and distress at the epigastric fossa and slight vertigo and dimness of vision.

After the experiments 
Beaumont published the account of his experiments in 1838 as Experiments and Observations on the Gastric Juice, and the Physiology of Digestion. Beaumont drew 51 conclusions about digestion based on his observations of Alexis St-Martin and his related research. Many of Beaumont's ideas were revolutionary for their time.  He determined that vegetables were digested more slowly than meat, that milk coagulated early in the digestive process, and that digestion is aided by a churning motion within the stomach. Beaumont's research into gastric juices was very advanced for the time. His work confirmed William Prout's theory that gastric juices contained hydrochloric acid, and he discovered further that gastric juice was secreted by the stomach lining. Without Alexis St-Martin, none of this work would have been possible.

Eventually Beaumont and St-Martin parted ways: St-Martin wrote to Beaumont from Berthier, Canada, on June 26, 1834, refusing to return to Beaumont. As an army doctor, Beaumont was posted to the Jefferson Barracks in St. Louis, Missouri, in 1834. He became Professor of Surgery in the Medical Department of Saint Louis University in 1837 and resigned from the army in 1839. Repeatedly, Beaumont tried to get St-Martin to move to St. Louis. Beaumont died in 1853.

When Alexis St-Martin died at Saint-Thomas, Quebec, in 1880 his family delayed his burial until the body began to decompose in order to prevent his "resurrection" by medical men, some of whom wished to perform an autopsy. Alexis Bidagan dit St-Martin is buried at Saint-Thomas Parish Cemetery in Joliette, Quebec, Canada.

The eminent physician Sir William Osler took a great interest in retracing the details of this early incident in the history of gastric physiology and published his research in the form of a well-known essay entitled A Backwoods Physiologist. He also attempted to have the famous stomach placed in the Army Medical Museum in Washington, DC.

Notes

References

Bibliography
 
 
 
 

1802 births
1880 deaths
Human subject research in the United States
Settlers of Canada
Shooting survivors